Constance Mary Monks (20 May 1911 – 4 February 1989), JP, OBE, née Green, was a British Conservative Party politician and teacher. She was also a partner with her husband in a newspaper business.

Education
She was educated in Leeds, Yorkshire at the Leeds City Teacher Training College.

Political career
She was a councillor on Chorley Municipal Borough Council from 1947–67 during which time she was Mayor from 1959–60. She was also a councillor on Lancashire County Council from 1961–64.

Monks was elected on her second attempt as Member of Parliament for Chorley constituency in 1970, but lost in February 1974 to the Labour candidate George Rodgers.  Monks was the first, and so far the only, female MP for Chorley.
She was a Justice of the Peace (JP) and was awarded the OBE in 1962.

References

Times Guide to the House of Commons February 1974

External links 
 

1911 births
1989 deaths
Mayors of places in Lancashire
Members of Lancashire County Council
Conservative Party (UK) MPs for English constituencies
Female members of the Parliament of the United Kingdom for English constituencies
Members of the Parliament of the United Kingdom for constituencies in Lancashire
UK MPs 1970–1974
20th-century British women politicians
20th-century English women
20th-century English people
Women councillors in England
Women mayors of places in England